Chakrapani Chalise was a Nepalese poet. He wrote the words of the first national anthem of Nepal in 1924 AD to the music composed by Bakhat Bahadur Budhapirthi in 1899 AD (grandfather of musician Louis Banks or Dambar Bahadur Budaprithi). The musical part of anthem was created during Prime Minister Bir Shamsher Jang Bahadur Rana's era. Later the Nepali Language Publications Committee was ordered to write words for the anthem. Chakrapani being assistant to Superintendent of the Committee, wrote the words for the anthem.

Chakrapani is considered as the poet who connected two different eras in Nepali literature. Motiram Bhatta's romanticistic era was connected to Lekhnath Paudyal's era by Pandit Chakrapani. Later, a commemorative stamp of Nepali Rupees 4.5 was issued for his contribution to Nepali literature.

His 133rd birth anniversary was celebrated by prize distribution and literary programme at Katunje, Bhaktapur by Chakrapani Smarak Samiti (a memorial committee).

Early years 
Chakrapani Chalise was born on 1940 B.S. (1883 A.D.) at Katunje, Bhaktapur district in a Chalise Brahmin family to father Premlal Chalise and mother. His mother died while he was young and he left to mother's maternal home after ill treatment by step mother. He married aged 12 to Gayatri Devi. He thereafter got realized and became a siddha guru.

Works 
His main published works are:
Machchhindranathko Katha (मच्छिन्द्रनाथको कथा)
Niti Ratna Manisha (नीति रत्न मञ्जुषा)
Nepali Samchhipta Ramayana (नेपाली संक्षिप्त रामायण)
Nepali Samchhipta Mahabharata (नेपाली संक्षिप्त महाभारत)
Meghadoot Chhaya (मेघदूत छायाँ)
Isabhasyopanishad (इशावास्योपनिषद)
Nepali Bagalikosh (नेपाली बगलीकोष)
Sahitya Mimamsa (साहित्य मिमांशा)
Manusmriti (मनुस्मृति)
Chakra Kabita Tarangini (चक्र कविता तरङ्गिणी)
Jaimanya Bharat (जैमनिय भारत)
Bhagawatibhola Bhajanmala (भगवतीभोला भजनमाला)
Shri Chitrakootothbhavakara
Chakrappan Chalisa
Jatayu Mimamsa
Pinda Kosha
Kanakadasa Mrityu Bhaya
Chaudeshwara Lingam
Laudeshwara Chingam
Modono Jzalila Indusevira
Sarvabhowmasya Jati Bheda
Saisha Chintamani
Shriman Bhagavadageedha
Gambhira Ramacharitham

References 

Nepalese male writers
1883 births
1958 deaths
People from Bhaktapur District